Aame Evaru? is a 1966 Indian Telugu-language psychological thriller film, produced and directed by B. S. Narayana. It stars Jaggayya and Jayalalitha with Vanisri, Prabhakar Reddy, Rajababu, Nagabhushanam, Radha and K. Malathi as part of the supporting cast. Music is by Vedha. Lyrics were written by Dasaradhi. The film is a remake of the 1964 Hindi hit film Woh Kaun Thi?.

Cast
 Jaggayya as Dr. Anand
 Jayalalitha as Santhya/chayya
 Vanisri as Dr. Lata
 Nagabhushanam
 Prabhakar Reddy
 K. Malathi as Anand's Mother
 Rajababu
 Radha
 Rajanala

Soundtrack
The music for this movie was composed by Vedha and lyrics were written by Dasaradhi.

References

External links
 

1966 films
Telugu remakes of Hindi films
1960s Telugu-language films
Indian black-and-white films
Indian mystery thriller films
Indian psychological thriller films
1960s mystery thriller films
1960s psychological thriller films